Babsko Praskalo is a waterfall in the Central Balkan National Park, Balkan Mountains, central Bulgaria. With a height of 54 m the waterfall is among the lowest in the area. 

Babsko Praskalo is located near the Rusalka and Ravna refuges, on the path between the village of Tazha and Tazha Refuge. The waterfall is situated on the river Babska which is a tributary of Tazha.

Waterfalls of Bulgaria
Balkan mountains
Landforms of Stara Zagora Province